William J. Ryan, Jr. (c. 1924 – June 7, 2002) was a psychologist and author best known for his criticism of "blaming the victim" first published in his 1971 book of the same title. Ryan's work is considered a major structuralist rebuttal to the Moynihan Report. Moynihan's report had placed most of the blame for African-American poverty rates on the rise of single-parent households rather than on racism and discrimination, while Ryan's response was that Moynihan was blaming victims for their victimhood. Ryan spent the majority of his career at Boston College.

Life and career
Ryan was raised in Everett, Massachusetts. After joining the Army Air Corps during WWII, he received a PhD from Boston University in 1958.

Ryan worked at the Yale School of Medicine and Harvard Medical School before arriving at Boston College, where he was Professor of Psychology from 1969 to 1998.

Ryan married Phyllis Milgroom in 1951 and lived in Newton, Massachusetts. He died in a Boston hospital on June 7, 2002.

Publications

, reissued in 1976

Further reading
  A volume dedicated to Ryan by his colleagues.

References

Boston College faculty
20th-century American psychologists
1920s births
2002 deaths